Pippuhana is a genus of anyphaenid sac spiders first described by Antônio Brescovit in 1997.

Species
 it contains four species:
Pippuhana calcar (Bryant, 1931) – USA
Pippuhana donaldi (Chickering, 1940) – Panama
Pippuhana gandu Brescovit, 1997 – Brazil
Pippuhana unicolor (Keyserling, 1891) – Brazil

References

Anyphaenidae
Araneomorphae genera
Spiders of Brazil
Spiders of North America
Taxa named by Antônio Brescovit